Watson is an unincorporated community in Utica Township, Clark County, Indiana.

History
A post office was established at Watson in 1872, and remained in operation until it was discontinued in 1928. Watson was laid out as a town in 1876.

Geography

References

Unincorporated communities in Clark County, Indiana
Unincorporated communities in Indiana
Louisville metropolitan area